Pickering High School may refer to:
 Pickering High School, Ajax, Ontario
 Pickering High School (Louisiana), Leesville, Louisiana
 Pickering High School, Hull, England